The Receiver statue is a  tall public statue in Green Bay, Wisconsin associated with the Green Bay Packers football team. Originally located outside the Green Bay Packers Hall of Fame, the statue was dedicated to the "great past, present and future enshrinees in the Green Bay Packers Hall of Fame" on June 8, 1985. The player on the statue had number 88 on his jersey and the name listed on the back jersey was "PACKER." The statue was sold in 2003 to Titletown Brewing and was moved to the corner of Dousman Street and Donald Driver Way in front of the old Chicago and North Western Railway Passenger Depot. It was re-dedicated in the likeness of Donald Driver on June 15, 2013.

Gallery

References

Culture of Green Bay, Wisconsin
History of the Green Bay Packers
Outdoor sculptures in Wisconsin
Tourist attractions in Brown County, Wisconsin